Trischalis subaurana is a moth in the family Erebidae. It was described by Francis Walker in 1863. It is found in the Indo-Australian tropics, from the north-eastern Himalayas and Hainan, China to the Bismarck Archipelago. The habitat consists of forests, ranging from the lowlands to the lower montane zone at about 1,000 meters.

References

Moths described in 1863
Nudariina